Valoneic acid dilactone is a hydrolysable tannin that can be isolated from the heartwood of Shorea laevifolia and in oaks species like the  North American white oak (Quercus alba) and European red oak (Quercus robur).

It shows an inhibitory effect on 5α-reductase, an enzyme involved in steroids metabolism and prostate cancer.

References

External links
 

Ellagitannins
5α-Reductase inhibitors
Lactones
Trihydroxybenzoic acids